Brenda Bezares (born Brenda Yamile Jiménez Loya; April 26, 1968 in Monterrey, Nuevo León, Mexico) is a Mexican actress, singer, TV hostess and former model. She known better for Vamos a ayudarnos, Liliana and Mi vida eres tú.

Career 
She graduated from the Faculty of Performing Arts in Monterrey, Nuevo León, and studied for two years Classical Dance at the Superior School of Music and Dance of Monterrey, as well as in courses of action with the actors and directors Xavier Marc and Sergio Jiménez.

He began his career as a model at age 13, participating in innumerable fashion shows for prestigious designers and advertising campaigns. As a dancer she started at age 15, participating in workshops of contemporary, jazz, as well as musical comedies at university level such as Vaseline, Cabaret, Así es el show and Un cuento de Navidad.

In 1989 she was named "Miss Nuevo León", a beauty contest that opened doors later to work on several telenovelas in the United States and Venezuela. He also conducted several shows on regiomontana television.

On June 21, 2012, she presented her first album as a solo singer, which was titled Sueños Cumplidos. The production includes nine tracks with a Latin, contemporary and had the collaboration of outstanding musicians. From this material was released his first single entitled Demasiado Fuerte (cover of Yolandita Monge); The second was titled Yo ya me voy.

Personal life 
Since 1991 she has been married to TV Host Mario Bezares, with whom she has two children: Alejandro and Alan. Her family life was severely affected after her husband was accused of being involved in the murder of Paco Stanley and imprisoned.

After the release of Mario Bezares, family difficulties continued until the actress was invited by a friend to attend a Christian congregation in which she and her husband would convert to Christianity. In 2013, she suffered a pulmonary embolism from which she recovered, and published an autobiographical entitled Demasiado Fuerte, la Novela.

Filmography

Theatre

Cada oveja con su pareja
Las consuegras
Diablos, cuanto Ángel
Chilaquiles con champagne
Mi adorada Mimí
El criado malcriado
La monja y la golfaSex and the crisisPastores a la diabla 2Las Mil y Dos Noches''

References

External links 
 

1968 births
Living people
Mexican telenovela actresses
Mexican television actresses
Mexican stage actresses
Mexican female models
Mexican women singers
Mexican television presenters
Actresses from Monterrey
Singers from Monterrey
20th-century Mexican actresses
21st-century Mexican actresses
People from Monterrey
Converts to Christianity
Mexican Christians
Mexican women television presenters